YH may refer to:
 Yorkshire and the Humber, a region of England
 Youth hostel
 YH-32 Hornet, a helicopter built by Hiller Aircraft